The Order of Christian Initiation of Adults (OCIA), or Ordo Initiationis Christianae Adultorum, is a process developed by the Catholic Church for its catechumenate for prospective converts to the Catholic faith above the age of infant baptism. Candidates are gradually introduced to aspects of Catholic beliefs and practices. The basic process applies to adults and children who have reached catechetical age. Formally the Order of Christian Initiation of Adults was known as the Rite of Christian Initiation of Adults (RCIA). The name was changed in 2021 to reflect greater fidelity to the original Latin.

Some Catholic movements, like the Polish Light-Life and the Spanish Neocatechumenal Way, promote post-baptismal formation based on the OCIA. Similarly, the Knights of Columbus provides a free correspondence course under the Catholic Information Services (CIS) program.

The ideal is for there to be an OCIA process available in every Roman Catholic parish.  Those who want to join an OCIA group should aim to attend one in the parish where they live.

For those who wish to join, the OCIA process is a period of reflection, prayer, instruction, discernment, and formation. There is no set timetable, and those who join the process are encouraged to go at their own pace and to take as much time as they need.

US bishops have said that the process "should extend for at least one year for formation, instruction, and probation" for those who have had no previous experience with living a Christian life. However, "nothing ... can be settled a priori. The time spent in the catechumenate should be long enough—several years if necessary—for the conversion and faith of the catechumens to become strong." For those who have some experience leading a Christian life, the process should be much shorter, "according to the individual case."

Those who enter the process are expected to begin attending Mass on Sundays, participate in regular faith formation activities, and to become increasingly involved in the activities of their local parish.

Priests "have the responsibility of attending to the pastoral and personal care of the catechumens." Throughout the process, they are assisted in this by deacons and catechists.

Outline of process
This outline is based upon the Order of Christian Initiation of Adults (OCIA) approved for use in the dioceses of the United States which includes additional rites for various circumstances and combinations. The numbers shown in the article headings and elsewhere relate to the relevant sections of the United States Conference of Catholic Bishops approved rite.

Period of Evangelization and Precatechumenate [Paragraphs 36 - 40]
"This is a time, of no fixed duration or structure, for inquiry and introduction to Gospel values." The church is offering here an invitation to initial conversion. There is no obligation involved during this period. "It is a time of evangelization: faithfully and constantly the living God is proclaimed and Jesus Christ who he has sent for the salvation of all." At this stage, seekers are known as Inquirers.

First Step: Acceptance into the Order of Catechumens [Paragraphs 41 - 47]

Inquirers who wish continue on to the period of the catechumenate celebrate the rite of Acceptance into the Order of Catechumens.

The rite of Acceptance into the Order of Catechumens may take place throughout the year. "A sponsor accompanies any candidate seeking admission as a catechumen." Ideally, the sponsor is provided to the candidate by the parish. The duties of a sponsor are to journey with the catechumens through the process and provide a compelling witness in matters of faith.

This is a very significant step, so much so that for catechumens (unbaptized): "One who dies during the Catechumenate receives a Christian burial."[47]

The outline of this Rite is as follows [Paragraphs 48 - 68]:

Receiving the Candidates

"The candidates and their sponsors, and a group of the faithful gather outside the church."

Greeting 
 Opening Dialogue
 Candidates' First Acceptance of the Gospel
 Affirmation by the Sponsors and the Assembly
 Signing of the Candidates with the Cross:
– Signing of the Forehead
– [Signing of the Other Senses] - optional
– Concluding Prayer
 Invitation to the Celebration of the Word of God

The mass then goes on as usually normal with: Liturgy of the Word
 Instruction
 Readings
 Homily
 [Presentation of a Bible] - optional
 Intercessions for the Catechumens
 Prayer over the Catechumens
At this point a new portion is added
 Dismissal of the Catechumens
From this point until their baptisms, catechumens are dismissed after the liturgy of the word when they attend Mass. This is to make the process feel more like it was in the early church, when catechumens were dismissed before communion before their baptism, which might have taken years to prepare for, to make the communion more meaningful.

Rite of Welcoming the Candidates [411 - 415]
Inquirers who have already been validly baptized in a non-Catholic ecclesial community, or baptized Catholic but not catechized as a child (have not received first Eucharist), are welcomed to this next stage via the Rite of Welcoming the Candidates. They enter this rite known as "candidates", and they are known by this title from now on. Their rite of welcoming the candidates often does not take place at the same time as the catechumen's rite of acceptance.

The outline of this rite is as follows [416 - 433]:

Receiving the Candidates
 Salutation
 Opening Dialogue
 Candidates' Declaration Of Intent
 Affirmation by the Sponsors and the Assembly
 Signing of the Candidates with the Cross:
 – Signing of the Forehead
 – [Signing of the Other Senses] - optional
 – Concluding Prayer

The Mass then continues as normal: Liturgy of the Word
 Instruction
 Readings
 Homily
 [Presentation of a Bible] - optional
 Profession of Faith
 General Intercessions
(At this point there is a special prayer over the candidates)
 [Dismissal of the Assembly] - if the Eucharist is not to be celebrated

Liturgy of the Eucharist

Candidates are sometimes dismissed during the Mass.

Combined Rite [505 - 506]

Where there are both unbaptized and baptized inquirers in a parish there is the option of a combined rite at this stage. This rite is formally known as "The (Combined) Celebration of the Rite of Acceptance into the Order of Catechumens and the Rite of Welcoming Baptized but Previously Uncatechized Adults Who are Preparing for Confirmation and/or Eucharist or Reception into the Full Communion of the Catholic Church".

The outline of this rite is as follows [507 - 529]:

Receiving the Candidates
 Greeting
 Opening Dialogue with Candidates for the Catechumenate and with the Candidates for Post-baptismal Catechesis
 Catechumens' First Acceptance of the Gospel
 Candidates' Declaration of Intent
 Affirmation by the Sponsors and the Assembly
 Signing of the Catechumens and of the Candidates with the Cross:
 – Signing of the Forehead of the Catechumens
 – [Signing of the Other Senses of the Catechumens] - optional
 – Signing of the Forehead of the Candidates
 – [Signing of the Other Senses of the Candidates] - optional
 – Concluding Prayer
 Invitation to the Celebration of the Word of God

Liturgy of the Word
 Instruction
 Readings
 Homily
 [Presentation of a Bible] - optional
 Intercessions
 Prayer over the Catechumens and Candidates
 Dismissal of the Catechumens

Liturgy of the Eucharist

These rites delineate the transition between the Period of Inquiry into the Period of the Catechumenate. The rites take place when the members of the local church are gathered together for the Eucharistic celebration.

Period of the Catechumenate [75 - 80]
A catechumen (from Latin catechumenus, Greek κατηχουμενος, instructed) is one receiving instruction in the principles of the Christian religion with a view to baptism. It is for this reason that those who are already validly baptized in another Christian Faith are not known as catechumens, but rather candidates.

The Catechumenate is an extended period during which the candidates are given suitable pastoral formation and guidance, aimed at training them in the Christian life. [75]

This is achieved in four ways {paraphrased}:
 Suitable catechesis; solidly supported by celebrations of the Word.
 The Catechumens learning to:
 – Turn more readily to God in prayer
 – To bear witness to the Faith
 – In all things to keep their hopes set on Christ
 – To follow supernatural inspiration in their deeds
 – To practice the love of neighbour, even at the cost of self-renunciation
 Suitable liturgical rites, which purify the Catechumens little by little and strengthen them with God's blessing; including celebrations of the Word.
 Learning to work actively with others to spread the Gospel.

From the Order of Christian Initiation of Adults

The period of the Catechumenate is a time for:
 Continuing to build community within the group
 Getting more involved in parish activities, getting to know the parish community
 Learning about the basic teachings and beliefs of the Catholic Church
 Exploring important and foundational Scripture passages

More importantly, it is a time for:
 Continuing to examine God's presence in our lives, past and present
 Developing prayer life, entering into the communal worship of the parish
 Fostering conversion
 Developing or improving our relationship with God

Various rites pertain to this period of instruction for those who are unbaptized (catechumens):
 Celebrations of the Word of God [81 - 89]
 Minor Exorcisms (not  [90 - 94])
 Blessings of the Catechumens [95 - 97]
 Anointing of the Catechumens [98 - 103]
 Presentations {Optional} [104 - 105]
 Sending of the Catechumens for Election (a meeting with the Bishop of Catechumens from many Parishes throughout a Diocese) {Optional} [106 - 117]

An optional rite also pertains to this period for those who are baptized (candidates):
 Rite of Sending the Candidates for Recognition by the Bishop and for the Call to Continuing Conversion [434 - 445]

There is also a combined optional rite if there are both catechumens and candidates in a parish:
 Parish Celebration for Sending Catechumens for Election and Candidates for Recognition by the Bishop [530 – 546]

The conclusion of this period leads onto the Rite of Election or Enrollment of Names for those who are unbaptized and the Rite of Calling the Candidates to Continuing Conversion for those who are baptized. This is a very significant and important step in the Rite of Christian Initiation of Adults.  It is usually celebrated on the first Sunday of Lent at the local diocesan cathedral, led by the local bishop. All of the Catechumens and Candidates, their Godparents (for Catechumens), and Sponsors (for Catechumens and Candidates) gather together on this day, which may involve hundreds of people. The Church formally ratifies the Catechumens' readiness for the Sacraments of Initiation and the Candidates' readiness to be received into full Communion with the Catholic Church. In turn the Catechumens – from now on known as the Elect – publicly acknowledge their desire to receive the Sacraments of Initiation, and the Candidates their desire to be received into full Communion with the Catholic Church.

Second Step: Election or Enrollment of Names [118 - 128]
The outline of this Rite is as follows [129 - 137]:

Liturgy of the Word
 Homily
 Presentation of the Catechumens
 Affirmation by the Godparents [and the Assembly]
 Invitation and Enrollment of Names
 Act of Admission or Election
 Intercessions for the Elect
 Prayer over the Elect
 Dismissal of the Elect
Liturgy of the Eucharist

This rite does not have to be a full Mass. In this case, there is no liturgy of the Eucharist, and thus no dismissal of the elect.

Rite of Calling the Candidates to Continuing Conversion [446 - 449]
The outline of this rite is as follows [450 - 458]:

Liturgy of the Word
 Homily
 Presentation of the Candidates for Confirmation and Eucharist
 Affirmation by the Sponsors [and the Assembly]
 Act of Recognition
 General Intercessions
 Prayer over the Candidates
 [Dismissal of the Assembly] – if the Eucharist is not to be celebrated

Liturgy of the Eucharist

Combined Rite [547 - 549]

Where there are both catechumens (unbaptized) and candidates (baptized) in a diocese there is the option of a combined rite at this stage. This rite is formally known as The (Combined) Celebration of the Rite of Election of Catechumens and the Call to Continuing Conversion of Candidates Who are Preparing for Confirmation and/or Eucharist or Reception into the Full Communion of the Catholic Church.

The outline of this rite is as follows [550 - 561]:

Celebration of Election
 Presentation of the Catechumens
 Affirmation by the Godparents [and the Assembly]
 Invitation and Enrollment of Names
 Act of Admission or Election

Celebration of the Call to Continuing Conversion
 Presentation of the Candidates
 Affirmation by the Sponsors [and the Assembly]
 Act of Recognition
 Intercessions for the Elect and the Candidates
 Prayer over the Elect and the Candidates
 Dismissal of the Elect

Liturgy of the Eucharist

Period of Purification and Enlightenment [138 - 149]
This period tends to correspond with Lent and is intended to be a period of increased discernment and coming closer to God.  The aim of this period is to eliminate what is weak and sinful, and affirm what is holy.  During this period the Elect undertake a number of Rites, including the Scrutinies and Presentations:

The outlines of these rites are as follows:

» First Scrutiny (3rd Sunday of Lent) [150 - 156]:

Liturgy of the Word
 Readings
 Homily
 Invitation to Private Prayer
 Intercessions for the Elect
 Exorcism
 Dismissal of the Elect

Liturgy of the Eucharist

» The Presentation of the Creed (3rd Week of Lent) [157 - 163]:

Liturgy of the Word
 Readings
 Homily
 Presentation of the Creed
 Prayer over the Elect
 Dismissal of the Elect

Liturgy of the Eucharist

» Second Scrutiny (4th Sunday of Lent) [164 - 170]:

Liturgy of the Word
 Readings
 Homily
 Invitation to Private Prayer
 Intercessions for the Elect
 Exorcism
 Dismissal of the Elect

Liturgy of the Eucharist

» Third Scrutiny (5th Sunday of Lent) [171 - 177]:

Liturgy of the Word
 Readings
 Homily
 Invitation to Private Prayer
 Intercessions for the Elect
 Exorcism
 Dismissal of the Elect

Liturgy of the Eucharist

» The Presentation of the Lord's Prayer (ideally the fifth Week of Lent) [178 - 184]:

Liturgy of the Word
 Readings
 Homily
 Gospel (Presentation of the Lord's Prayer)
 Homily
 Prayer over the Elect
 Dismissal of the Elect

Liturgy of the Eucharist

» Preparation Rites on Holy Saturday [185 - 192]:

 - Recitation of the Creed [193 - 196]
 - Ephphetha [197 - 199]
 - Choosing a Baptismal Name [200 - 202]
 - Concluding Rites [203 - 205]

The Candidates meanwhile prepare for the Sacrament of Reconciliation with an optional Penitential Rite Scrutiny [459 – 472]. This takes place on the second Sunday of Lent.

The Easter Vigil
At the Easter Vigil the celebration of the sacraments of initiation takes place, Baptism, Confirmation, and Holy Communion; according to the latest USCCB guidelines, this ceremony is to be reserved for Catechumens, so that no confusion will arise among the congregation about who is becoming a Christian (Catechumens) and who is merely being confirmed as a Catholic (Candidates). The guidelines also state that the formation process for Candidates—including its length—should be decided on a case-by-case basis and ideally conclude with a Confirmation at a regular Sunday Mass other than (and typically well before) Easter Vigil. At such a Mass, Candidates (having already been baptized)  need only celebrate Confirmation and the Eucharist.

At the Easter Vigil, the Elect celebrate all of the sacraments of initiation; they are thereafter called Neophytes and they are considered to be full members of the Christian faithful. The Rites used to confer these Sacraments are outlined below. At some college campuses that have spring breaks during Holy Week, initiation for both the baptized and the unbaptized is often done during the weeks after Easter, so more of the community can be present.

Third Step: Celebration of the Sacraments of Initiation [206 - 217]
The Celebration of the Sacraments of Initiation is the Rite undertaken by the Elect (unbaptized).

The outline of this Rite is as follows [218 - 243]:

Liturgy of the Word

Celebration of Baptism

 Presentation of the Elect
 Invitation to Prayer
 Litany of the Saints
 Blessing of the Baptismal Waters
 Profession of Faith:
- Renunciation of Sin- Profession of the Catholic Faith by the Catechumens and Candidates
 Baptism
 Explanatory Rites:
 - [Anointing after Baptism] - if Confirmation is separated from the Catechumen's Baptism
 - [Clothing with a Baptismal Garment] - optional
 - Presentation of a Lighted Candle

Celebration of Confirmation
 Invitation
 Laying on of Hands
 Anointing with Chrism

The confirmation can take place at the same time as the baptism, by anointing with the oil immediately after the pouring of the water.

Renewal of Baptismal Promises (at the Easter Vigil) for the congregation
 Invitation
 Renewal of Baptismal Promises:
 - Renunciation of Sin
 - Profession of Faith
 Sprinkling with Baptismal Water

Liturgy of the Eucharist

The Rite of Reception of Baptized Christians into the full Communion of the Catholic Church [473 - 486]

The Rite of Reception of Baptized Christians into the full Communion of the Catholic Church is the Rite undertaken by the Candidates (baptized).

The outline of this Rite (within Mass) is as follows [487 - 498]:

Liturgy of the Word
 Readings
 Homily

Celebration of Reception
 Invitation
 Profession of Faith
 Act of Reception
[Confirmation]: - omitted if the Candidate has already been Confirmed
 - Laying on of Hands
 - Anointing with Chrism
 Celebrant's Sign of Welcome
 General Intercessions
 Sign of Peace

Liturgy of the Eucharist

The Combined Rite [562 - 565]
Where there are both Elect (unbaptized) and Candidates (baptized) in a Parish there is the option of a combined Rite at this stage.  This Rite is formally known as The (Combined) Celebration at the Easter Vigil of the Sacraments of Initiation and of the Rite of Reception into the Full Communion of the Catholic Church.

The outline of this rite is as follows [566 - 594]:

Service of Light

Liturgy of the Word

Celebration of Baptism

 Presentation of the Elect
 Invitation to Prayer
 Litany of the Saints
 Prayer over the Water
 Profession of Faith:
 - Renunciation of Sin
 - Profession of Faith
 Baptism
 Explanatory Rites
 - [Anointing after Baptism] - if Confirmation is separated from the Catechumen's Baptism
 - [Clothing with a Baptismal Garment]- optional
 - Presentation of a Lighted Candle

Renewal of Baptismal Promises
 Invitation
 Renewal of Baptismal Promises:
 - Renunciation of Sin
 - Profession of Faith
 Sprinkling with Baptismal Water

Celebration of Reception
 Invitation
 Profession by the Candidates
 Act of reception

Celebration of Confirmation
 Invitation
 Laying on of Hands
 Anointing with Chrism

Liturgy of the Eucharist

See also

 Associations of the faithful
 Catechism of the Catholic Church
 Catholic laity
 Glossary of the Catholic Church
 History of the Catholic Church
 Index of Catholic Church articles
 Lay ecclesial ministry
 List of Ecclesial movements
 Outline of Catholicism
 Timeline of the Catholic Church

References

Further reading 
 Ralph Keifer, Christian Initiation: the State of the Question, in: Aidan Kavanagh et al., Made, Not Born: New Perspectives on Christian Initiation and the Catechumenate, Notre Dame: University of Notre Dame Press, 1976.
 William Harmless SJ, The RCIA: Its Catechetical Gaps and Silences, in: Idem, Augustine and the Catechumenate, Collegeville: The Liturgical Press, 1995, pp. 1–36.
 A Critical Analysis of the Rite of Christian Initiation of Adults (RCIA), Victoria Millan MEd unpublished thesis for the University of Liverpool;

External links
Constitution on the Sacred Liturgy
 RCIA Network
 OCIA Summary, USCCB website
 TeamRCIA | Start and sustain the catechumenate
 The Association for Catechumenal Ministry
 The Blog That's All About RCIA
 The North American Forum on the Catechumenate preservation
 Waking Up Catholic - RCIA Resources

Catholic theology and doctrine
Catholic liturgy